Queen Street station may refer to:

Queen Street bus station, Brisbane, Queensland, Australia
Queen Street Station (Gold Coast), Queensland, Australia
Queen Street (Levin) railway station, New Zealand
Cardiff Queen Street railway station, Wales, UK
Glasgow Queen Street railway station, Scotland, UK
Queen Street Station (Lancaster, Pennsylvania), a transit center in Lancaster, Pennsylvania, US

See also
Queen Street Bus Terminal, in Bugis, Singapore
Queen station (Kitchener), a light rail station in Kitchener, Ontario, Canada
Queen station (Toronto), a subway station in Toronto, Canada
Queen Street (disambiguation)